Lukáš Novák (born September 21, 1993) is a Czech professional ice hockey player. He currently plays with Piráti Chomutov in the Czech Extraliga.

Novák made his Czech Extraliga debut playing with Piráti Chomutov debut during the 2013–14 Czech Extraliga season.

References

External links

1993 births
Living people
Czech ice hockey forwards
Piráti Chomutov players
Sportovní Klub Kadaň players
Sportspeople from Hradec Králové